Combattler V, full name , is a Japanese mecha anime television series produced by Toei Dōga and animated by Soeisha (later renamed as Nippon Sunrise) that aired from 1976 to 1977. It is the first part of the Robot Romance Trilogy of Super Robot series created by Saburo Yatsude and directed by Tadao Nagahama.

The robot's name is a portmanteau of "combine", "combat", and "battle", and the V is intended both as an abbreviation for "victory" and in reference to the five component machines that form the robot, as well as its five pilots. The V is pronounced as the letter V, unlike in the spiritual successor, Voltes V, where it is pronounced "five".

The show follows the adventures and battles of the Battle Team, a group of young pilots, as they battle against the Campbell Empire from outer space.

Story

Thousands of years ago, the people of the planet Campbell decided to leave their planet and seek out new worlds to inhabit. One group, led by the scientist Oreana, landed on Earth, but was delayed from their mission. In the early 21st century, Oreana's group reawakens and begins their plan to conquer the Earth. The only effective defense against the Campbellians' giant bio-mechanical slave beasts is the super-electromagnetic robot, Combattler V and its pilots.

The entire series follows the then-standard monster-of-the-week format, with the first season featuring Garuda sending various mecha to defeat Combattler V. His tactics range from brute force to cunningness and taking hostages. He even duels Hyouma in a sword fight with their feet chained together; though just as Hyouma is about to kill him, he is saved by Oreana. As the series moves on, his trust for Oreana lessens. Garuda eventually discovers that he is in fact a cyborg, and uncovers a robot specifically designed for him. In the final episode of the first season, he defeats Oreana, and duels Combattler V, which eventually leads to his defeat.

The second season features Empress Janelor and her generals Dungele and Warchimedes. The way the second season is structured is quite similar to that of the first, but involves more serious plot points such as the taking of hostages and plots to kill the team. Eventually, the entire base of the Campbellian empress is deployed, and only through the help of the airborne Nanbara Connection Base is Combattler V able to destroy it. However, Janelor manages to deploy an "Earth Bomb" which is supposed to destroy the Earth. Notably, the team is not dispirited, but are quite calm and instead happy for having the chance to fight to protect Earth. Just as it looks as though Earth will be destroyed, the "true" leader of the Campbellians, Deus, riding in a golden wagon, informs the team of the coup d'etat at Campbell, and stops the bomb seconds before it burrows into the core of the Earth.

Characters

Battle Team
  /   The hot-blooded leader of the team, dressed in red. Hyoma is an avid motorcyclist and speed freak. He pilots the Battle Jet, which forms the head of Combattler V. After Garuda destroys his arms, he gets cybernetic replacements. He is known as "Glen Hyoma" in the Philippines.
  /   The second member of the team, dressed in blue. Juzo is a cool, level-headed Olympic-class marksman. He pilots the Battle Crusher, which forms the chest and arms of Combattler V. He is the only member of the team whose birthdate is revealed: April 1, 1958. He is known as "Jason Juzo" in the Philippines.
  /   The third member, dressed in brown. Daisaku is a judo master who also enjoys sketching. He pilots the Battle Tank, which forms the torso of Combattler V, and the Battle Tank is also the only Battle Machine that cannot fly under its own power. He is known as "Bob Nishikawa" in the Philippines.
  /   The fourth member, and only female member of the team, dressed in pink. Chizuru is also the granddaughter of Doctor Nanbara. She pilots the Battle Marine, which forms the legs of Combattler V. Upon learning that she has valvular heart disease, she tries to hide it until it disables her in the middle of a battle. Afterwards, she undergoes surgery to correct the condition and returns to continue the fight against the Campbellians. Eventually, she falls in love with Hyoma. She is known as "Stephanie Nambarra" in the Philippines.
  /   The fifth member, dressed in green. Kosuke is a child genius and inventor. He pilots the Battle Craft, which forms Combattler V's feet. He is known as "Kevin Kosuke" in the Philippines.
  /   The founder and director of the Nanbara Connection, the Battle Team's base of operations, and creator of Combattler V. He dies shortly into the series, after naming Professor Yotsuya his successor.
  /   After the death of Professor Nanbara, Yotsuya takes over the operation of the Nanbara Connection. A drunkard and misanthrope, he nevertheless vows to defend the earth from the alien invaders.
  /   A red robot that monitors the emotional state of the Battle Team, and authorizes combination by shouting "Combine O.K.!".
  /  and   The children of Nanbara Connection's cook, who show up after the midpoint of the series. They played the role of comic relief, giving the latter half of the series a much more comedic tone than the serious first half. Along with their pet frog, Keroppe, they sometimes pilot the sidekick machine Kerott into battle.
  /   The head of the Lawrence Robotics Research Institution in the country of Great Fridden, and the Garganchuwa's developer. He appears in episode 18 but is killed.

Campbellians
  /   Garuda's "mother", Oreana orders him to attack the earth. The Campbellians' greatest scientist, she built a giant statue to house her mind in before coming to earth in search of a new home for her people. After her dismissal of Garuda and his discovery of the truth behind his existence, she reveals a mechanical body housed within the statue and attempts to attack Combattler using a 'Null Electromagnetic Ray' from her forehead to drain the robot of its power, but she is ultimately destroyed by Garuda.
  /   The ostensible leader of the Campbellian's attacks on earthling cities, Garuda oversees the deployment of the Slave Monsters (monster of the week). He is able to change his appearance at will from a blue-skinned, blonde-haired human to a humanoid eagle. After numerous failures to destroy Combattler V and the Nanbara Connection, he is stripped of his rank by Oreana. Soon after, he learns the truth of his origin: That he is actually the last in a line of androids created by Oreana to be her perfect son and the leader of the invasion force. Consumed by revenge, he finishes building the incomplete slave beast Big Garuda and uses it to destroy half part of Oreana's head. After Oreana gets killed by Combattler V, he ultimately battles it but gets defeated and died.
  /   One of Garuda's android assistants. She is secretly in love with Garuda, but he is oblivious to her feelings. In a gambit to save Garuda after he is dismissed, she sacrifices her life piloting the slave beast Demon against Combattler V.
  /   Another of Garuda's subordinates, he is in charge of training and activating the slave beasts that fight Combattler V. 
  /   Garuda's strategic advisor. After Garuda's dismissal, he is given command of Oreana's forces, only to be killed by Combattler V during the latter's confrontation with Oreana.
  /   The final enemy of Combattler V and a very powerful sorceress. She can transform from a beautiful woman into a snakelike creature. She has a eyed-magical cane which can impose orders to Warchimedes and Dungele's helmets for their disobedience. In the penultimate episode, she attempts to destroy the Nanbara Connection and Combattler V with a bomb attached to Combattler's foot. Professor Yotsuya discovers the bomb in time to separate the foot from the rest of Combattler and raise the Choudenji Barrier, sacrificing the Connection and saving Combattler. Upon hearing of the revolt on Campbell, she makes a final attack on the forces of the Earth, but is defeated by Combattler. As her final revenge, she attempts to destroy the earth by sending a thermonuclear explosive into the planet's core. As she attempts to escape earth, Warchimedes confronts her and destroys himself to kill her.
  /   Janera's scientific and strategic advisor, and Dungele's older brother. He coordinates the building and selection of the Magma Beasts that are sent to fight Combattler V. After the death of Dungele, he pilots a Magma Beast into battle, attacking Combattler V and giving Janera the opportunity to destroy the Nanbara Connection. When he is defeated, his brain is transferred into a robot body, which he then self-destructs to kill Janera. His name, pronounced "Warukimedesu" in Japanese, rather than being partly based on the English word "war", may be better regarded as a portmanteau formed from "waru" (meaning "evil") and "Arukimedesu" (Archimedes), thus epitomising the classic sci-fi concept of a great but evil scientist.
  /  Janera's other subordinate, and Warchimedes's younger brother. He pilots the Magma Beasts against Combattler V and the Nanbara Connection. One of his hands is an oversized lobster-like pincer. After numerous defeats at the hands of Combattler V, Janera kills him by detonating a bomb inside his helmet.
  /   The true leader of the Campbellians. After the coup d'etat which overthrew Janera's supporters on Campbell, he came to Earth to help rebuild the cities damaged by Janera's attacks.

Mechanics

Production
The series (along with the later two shows) was created by Saburo Yatsude, who would later go on to create GoLion (best known to American viewers as the "Lion Force" half of Voltron). "Saburo Yatsude" is not a real person, but a pseudonym which refers to the collective staff at Toei (the main office, rather than the animation studio; the series was animated by Soeisha and produced by Toei Company). The series was animated by Sunrise on Toei's behalf.

A sizable portion of the staff that worked on the earlier show Yuusha Raideen also worked on Combattler V. However, according to Tadao Nagahama, there were still efforts to sell a continuation to Raideen even when it looked to be clearly ending, ignoring the demands of Combattler's producer, Takashi Iijima. In the end, right at the point where creating the new program would have been at the last second, Nagahama rejected the continuation of Raideen and its staff finally went over to work on Combattler, putting pressure on their schedule.

Getter Robo also largely influenced the design of Combattler V itself, as toys made of the former were unable to replicate its three-state combination abilities to an extent that satisfied consumers. Thus, Combattler V was designed in such a way that toy makers would be able to include this function more easily. The same concept would later go on to be used in Voltes V and in the Super Sentai series.

Media
Combattler V ran for 54 episodes from April 17, 1976, to May 28, 1977. Various manga adaptations were released both during its airing and afterwards. Many toys were also produced. The anime itself was brought to the Philippines and dubbed in English and later Filipino, Cebuano and Hiligaynon.
The show first aired on RPN in 1979.

The series saw sequels in both Voltes V and Daimos and is the first show in Nagahama's Robot Romance Trilogy.

Combattler V appeared in the United States during the late 1970s as part of Mattel's Shogun Warriors line of imported Super Robot toys under the name of 'Combattra', and as such was one of the three Super Robots in the Marvel Comics companion series.

In addition, Combattler V and its storyline have appeared in many entries in the Super Robot Wars franchise of video games.

Themes
All lyrics are credited to Saburou Yatsude (the pseudonym for the production studio), while the songs were composed by Asei Kobayashi and arranged by Hiroshi Tsutsui.
Opening Theme
 by Ichiro Mizuki and The Fressun Four

Ending Theme
 by Ichiro Mizuki and the Colombia Yurikago-kai

Insert Songs
 by Ichiro Mizuki and the Colombia Yurikago-kai
 by Ichiro Mizuki and Koroogi '73

References

External links

Combattler V at IMDB

1976 anime television series debuts
1977 Japanese television series endings
Alien invasions in television
Discotek Media
Shōnen manga
Toei Animation television
Sunrise (company)
Super robot anime and manga